Ihor Volodymyrovych Zakharyak (born 9 May 1964) is a Ukrainian football manager and a former player. He also holds Russian citizenship.

Coaching career
On 5 December 2018, he was appointed manager of FC Sokol Saratov.

References

External links
 
 

1964 births
People from Kerch
Living people
Soviet footballers
FC Okean Kerch players
SC Tavriya Simferopol players
FC Kuban Krasnodar players
FC Ahrotekhservis Sumy players
Soviet First League players
Soviet Second League players
Soviet Second League B players
Ukrainian First League players
Ukrainian Second League players
Ukrainian footballers
Ukrainian football managers
Russian football managers
FC Spartak Sumy managers
PFC Sumy managers
FC Shakhter Karagandy managers
Ukrainian expatriate football managers
Expatriate football managers in Kazakhstan
FC Baltika Kaliningrad managers
Ukrainian expatriate sportspeople in Kazakhstan
Association football defenders
FC Sokol Saratov managers
Ukrainian First League managers
Ukrainian Second League managers